Platyptilia rhyncholoba is a moth of the family Pterophoridae. It is known from the Democratic Republic of Congo, Kenya, Rwanda, Tanzania and Uganda.

References

rhyncholoba
Moths of Africa
Moths described in 1924